Aoral is a district located in Kampong Speu Province in central Cambodia.  It includes Phnom Aural, the highest peak in Cambodia.

Administration
Aoral District is subdivided into 5 communes (khum)

References

Districts of Kampong Speu province